James Edward Dickson (born April 20, 1938) is an American retired professional baseball player, primarily a relief pitcher, who appeared in 109 games in the major leagues for the Houston Colt .45s, Cincinnati Reds and Kansas City Athletics over all or parts of four seasons from  to . He attended Clark College and the University of Oregon.

Playing career
Dickson spent his first four years in professional baseball in the Pittsburgh Pirates' farm system until he was drafted by the Colt .45s, a first-year expansion team, after he won ten games in the Class B Three-I League in 1961.

He debuted for Houston in July 1963, and in his third appearance he earned his first major league save with 1 innings of scoreless relief, preserving Bob Bruce's 4–2 victory over the Milwaukee Braves on July 5. He gave up no runs and only one hit in his first four outings, but poor performances against the St. Louis Cardinals on July 20–21 and the Pirates on July 30 inflated his earned run average to 9.31 by the end of the month. On January 20, 1964, Dickson was traded with another young pitcher, Wally Wolf, to Cincinnati for veteran infielder Eddie Kasko. He worked in only four early-season games as a relief pitcher for the  Reds, but gained his first major league victory on May 5 against the Pirates. He then won nine games as a reliever for Triple-A San Diego and was selected by Kansas City in the 1964 Rule 5 draft that November.

He won three of five decisions, one of only two Kansas City pitchers to post a winning record for a 103-loss, last-place team. He registered no saves. He then began 1966 with the Athletics, and was less effective in 23 appearances with a 4.86 earned run average. On July 24, 1966, he was given his only major league starting pitcher assignment against the Washington Senators. Staked to a 4–0 lead in the first inning, he pitched well for the first three frames but then ran into trouble in the fourth, surrendering four runs, two coming on a home run by former teammate Ken Harrelson. Dickson earned a "no decision" in that contest, but he was sent down to Triple-A after that game and spent the remainder of his pro career in the top level of minor league baseball, retiring after the 1970 season.

All told, in 142 innings pitched in the majors, he allowed 135 hits and 77 bases on balls with 86 strikeouts. He won five of eight decisions and added three saves.

References

External links

Jim Dickson at Pura Pelota (Venezuelan Professional Baseball League)

1938 births
Living people
Baseball players from Portland, Oregon
Burlington Bees players
Cardenales de Lara players
American expatriate baseball players in Venezuela
Cincinnati Reds players
Columbus/Gastonia Pirates players
Douglas Copper Kings players
Grand Forks Chiefs players
Houston Colt .45s players
Iowa Oaks players
Kansas City Athletics players
Major League Baseball pitchers
Mobile A's players
Oklahoma City 89ers players
Oregon Ducks baseball players
Phoenix Giants players
San Diego Padres (minor league) players
Savannah Pirates players
Vancouver Mounties players